Pectin ( : "congealed" and "curdled") is a heteropolysaccharide, a structural acid contained in the primary lamella, in the middle lamella, and in the cell walls of terrestrial plants. The principal, chemical component of pectin is galacturonic acid (a sugar acid derived from galactose) which was isolated and described by Henri Braconnot in 1825. Commercially produced pectin is a white-to-light-brown powder, produced from citrus fruits for use as an edible gelling agent, especially in jams and jellies, dessert fillings, medications, and sweets; and as a food stabiliser in fruit juices and milk drinks, and as a source of dietary fiber.

Biology 
Pectin is composed of complex polysaccharides that are present in the primary cell walls of a plant, and are abundant in the green parts of terrestrial plants.
Pectin is the principal component of the middle lamella, where it binds cells. Pectin is deposited by exocytosis into the cell wall via vesicles produced in the Golgi apparatus. The amount, structure and chemical composition of pectin is different among plants, within a plant over time, and in various parts of a plant. Pectin is an important cell wall polysaccharide that allows primary cell wall extension and plant growth. During fruit ripening, pectin is broken down by the enzymes pectinase and pectinesterase, in which process the fruit becomes softer as the middle lamellae break down and cells become separated from each other. A similar process of cell separation caused by the breakdown of pectin occurs in the abscission zone of the petioles of deciduous plants at leaf fall.

Pectin is a natural part of the human diet, but does not contribute significantly to nutrition. The daily intake of pectin from fruits and vegetables can be estimated to be around 5 g if approximately 500 g of fruits and vegetables are consumed per day.

In human digestion, pectin binds to cholesterol in the gastrointestinal tract and slows glucose absorption by trapping carbohydrates. Pectin is thus a soluble dietary fiber. In non-obese diabetic (NOD) mice pectin has been shown to increase the incidence of diabetes.

A study found that after consumption of fruit the concentration of methanol in the human body increased by as much as an order of magnitude due to the degradation of natural pectin (which is esterified with methanol) in the colon.

Pectin has been observed to have some function in repairing the DNA of some types of plant seeds, usually desert plants. Pectinaceous surface pellicles, which are rich in pectin, create a mucilage layer that holds in dew that helps the cell repair its DNA.

Consumption of pectin has been shown to slightly (3–7%) reduce blood LDL cholesterol levels. The effect depends upon the source of pectin; apple and citrus pectins were more effective than orange pulp fibre pectin. The mechanism appears to be an increase of viscosity in the intestinal tract, leading to a reduced absorption of cholesterol from bile or food. In the large intestine and colon, microorganisms degrade pectin and liberate short-chain fatty acids that have positive influence on health (prebiotic effect).

Chemistry

Pectins, also known as pectic polysaccharides, are rich in galacturonic acid. Several distinct polysaccharides have been identified and characterised within the pectic group. Homogalacturonans are linear chains of α-(1–4)-linked D-galacturonic acid. Substituted galacturonans are characterised by the presence of saccharide appendant residues (such as D-xylose or D-apiose in the respective cases of xylogalacturonan and apiogalacturonan) branching from a backbone of D-galacturonic acid residues. Rhamnogalacturonan I pectins (RG-I) contain a backbone of the repeating disaccharide: 4)-α-D-galacturonic acid-(1,2)-α-L-rhamnose-(1. From many of the rhamnose residues, sidechains of various neutral sugars branch off. The neutral sugars are mainly D-galactose, L-arabinose and D-xylose, with the types and proportions of neutral sugars varying with the origin of pectin.

Another structural type of pectin is rhamnogalacturonan II (RG-II), which is a less frequent, complex, highly branched polysaccharide. Rhamnogalacturonan II is classified by some authors within the group of substituted galacturonans since the rhamnogalacturonan II backbone is made exclusively of D-galacturonic acid units.

Isolated pectin has a molecular weight of typically 60,000 to 130,000 g/mol, varying with origin and extraction conditions.

In nature, around 80 percent of carboxyl groups of galacturonic acid are esterified with methanol. This proportion is decreased to a varying degree during pectin extraction. Pectins are classified as high- versus low-methoxy pectins (short HM-pectins versus LM-pectins), with more or less than half of all the galacturonic acid esterified. The ratio of esterified to non-esterified galacturonic acid determines the behaviour of pectin in food applications – HM-pectins can form a gel under acidic conditions in the presence of high sugar concentrations, while LM-pectins form gels by interaction with divalent cations, particularly Ca2+, according to the idealized ‘egg box’ model, in which ionic bridges are formed between calcium ions and the ionised carboxyl groups of the galacturonic acid.

In high-methoxy pectins at soluble solids content above 60% and a pH value between 2.8 and 3.6, hydrogen bonds and hydrophobic interactions bind the individual pectin chains together. These bonds form as water is bound by sugar and forces pectin strands to stick together. These form a three-dimensional molecular net that creates the macromolecular gel. The gelling-mechanism is called a low-water-activity gel or sugar-acid-pectin gel.

While low-methoxy pectins need calcium to form a gel, they can do so at lower soluble solids and higher pH than high-methoxy pectins. Normally low-methoxy pectins form gels with a range of pH from 2.6 to 7.0 and with a soluble solids content between 10 and 70%.

The non-esterified galacturonic acid units can be either free acids (carboxyl groups) or salts with sodium, potassium, or calcium. The salts of partially esterified pectins are called pectinates, if the degree of esterification is below 5 percent the salts are called pectates, the insoluble acid form, pectic acid.

Some plants, such as sugar beet, potatoes and pears, contain pectins with acetylated galacturonic acid in addition to methyl esters. Acetylation prevents gel-formation but increases the stabilising and emulsifying effects of pectin.

Amidated pectin is a modified form of pectin. Here, some of the galacturonic acid is converted with ammonia to carboxylic acid amide. These pectins are more tolerant of varying calcium concentrations that occur in use.

Thiolated pectin exhibits substantially improved gelling properties since this thiomer is able to crosslink via disulfide bond formation. These high gelling properties are advantageous for various pharmaceutical applications and applications in food industry.

To prepare a pectin-gel, the ingredients are heated, dissolving the pectin. Upon cooling below gelling temperature, a gel starts to form. If gel formation is too strong, syneresis or a granular texture are the result, while weak gelling leads to excessively soft gels.

Amidated pectins behave like low-ester pectins but need less calcium and are more tolerant of excess calcium. Also, gels from amidated pectin are thermoreversible; they can be heated and after cooling solidify again, whereas conventional pectin-gels will afterwards remain liquid.

High-ester pectins set at higher temperatures than low-ester pectins. However, gelling reactions with calcium increase as the degree of esterification falls. Similarly, lower pH-values or higher soluble solids (normally sugars) increase gelling speeds. Suitable pectins can therefore be selected for jams and jellies, or for higher-sugar confectionery jellies.

Sources and production 
Pears, apples, guavas, quince, plums, gooseberries, and oranges and other citrus fruits contain large amounts of pectin, while soft fruits, like cherries, grapes, and strawberries, contain small amounts of pectin.

Typical levels of pectin in fresh fruits and vegetables are:

Apples, 1–1.5%
Apricots, 1%
Cherries, 0.4%
Oranges, 0.5–3.5%
Carrots 1.4%
Citrus peels, 30%
Rose hips, 15%

The main raw materials for pectin production are dried citrus peels or apple pomace, both by-products of juice production. Pomace from sugar beets is also used to a small extent.

From these materials, pectin is extracted by adding hot dilute acid at pH values from 1.5 to 3.5. During several hours of extraction, the protopectin loses some of its branching and chain length and goes into solution. After filtering, the extract is concentrated in a vacuum and the pectin is then precipitated by adding ethanol or isopropanol. An old technique of precipitating pectin with aluminium salts is no longer used (apart from alcohols and polyvalent cations, pectin also precipitates with proteins and detergents).

Alcohol-precipitated pectin is then separated, washed, and dried. Treating the initial pectin with dilute acid leads to low-esterified pectins. When this process includes ammonium hydroxide (NH3(aq)), amidated pectins are obtained. After drying and milling, pectin is usually standardised with sugar, and sometimes calcium salts or organic acids, to optimise performance in a particular application.

Uses
The main use for pectin is as a gelling agent, thickening agent and stabiliser in food. The classical application is giving the jelly-like consistency to jams or marmalades, which would otherwise be sweet juices. Pectin also reduces syneresis in jams and marmalades and increases the gel strength of low-calorie jams. For household use, pectin is an ingredient in gelling sugar (also known as "jam sugar") where it is diluted to the right concentration with sugar and some citric acid to adjust pH. In some countries, pectin is also available as a solution or an extract, or as a blended powder, for home jam making.

For conventional jams and marmalades that contain above 60% sugar and soluble fruit solids, high-ester pectins are used. With low-ester pectins and amidated pectins, less sugar is needed, so that diet products can be made. Water extract of aiyu seeds is traditionally used in Taiwan to make aiyu jelly, where the extract gels without heating due to low-ester pectins from the seeds and the bivalent cations from the water.

Pectin is used in confectionery jellies to give a good gel structure, a clean bite and to confer a good flavour release. Pectin can also be used to stabilise acidic protein drinks, such as drinking yogurt, to improve the mouth-feel and the pulp stability in juice based drinks and as a fat substitute in baked goods.
Typical levels of pectin used as a food additive are between 0.5 and 1.0% – this is about the same amount of pectin as in fresh fruit.

In medicine, pectin increases viscosity and volume of stool so that it is used against constipation and diarrhea. Until 2002, it was one of the main ingredients used in Kaopectate a medication to combat diarrhea, along with kaolinite. It has been used in gentle heavy metal removal from biological systems. Pectin is also used in throat lozenges as a demulcent.

In cosmetic products, pectin acts as a stabiliser. Pectin is also used in wound healing preparations and speciality medical adhesives, such as colostomy devices.

Sriamornsak revealed that pectin could be used in various oral drug delivery platforms, e.g., controlled release systems, gastro-retentive systems, colon-specific delivery systems and mucoadhesive delivery systems, according to its intoxicity and low cost. It was found that pectin from different sources provides different gelling abilities, due to variations in molecular size and chemical composition. Like other natural polymers, a major problem with pectin is inconsistency in reproducibility between samples, which may result in poor reproducibility in drug delivery characteristics.

In ruminant nutrition, depending on the extent of lignification of the cell wall, pectin is up to 90% digestible by bacterial enzymes. Ruminant nutritionists recommend that the digestibility and energy concentration in forages be improved by increasing pectin concentration in the forage.

In cigars, pectin is considered an excellent substitute for vegetable glue and many cigar smokers and collectors use pectin for repairing damaged tobacco leaves on their cigars.

Yablokov et al., writing in Chernobyl: Consequences of the Catastrophe for People and the Environment, quote research conducted by the Ukrainian Center of Radiation Medicine and the Belarusian Institute of Radiation Medicine and Endocrinology, concluded, regarding pectin's radioprotective effects, that "adding pectin preparations to the food of inhabitants of the Chernobyl-contaminated regions promotes an effective excretion of incorporated radionuclides" such as cesium-137. The authors reported on the positive results of using pectin food additive preparations in a number of clinical studies conducted on children in severely polluted areas, with up to 50% improvement over control groups.

During the Second World War, Allied pilots were provided with maps printed on silk, for navigation in escape and evasion efforts. The printing process at first proved nearly impossible because the several layers of ink immediately ran, blurring outlines and rendering place names illegible until the inventor of the maps, Clayton Hutton, mixed a little pectin with the ink and at once the pectin coagulated the ink and prevented it from running, allowing small topographic features to be clearly visible.

Legal status
At the Joint FAO/WHO Expert Committee Report on Food Additives and in the European Union, no numerical acceptable daily intake (ADI) has been set, as pectin is considered safe.

In the United States, pectin is generally recognised as safe for human consumption.

In the International Numbering System (INS), pectin has the number 440. In Europe, pectins are differentiated into the E numbers E440(i) for non-amidated pectins and E440(ii) for amidated pectins. There are specifications in all national and international legislation defining its quality and regulating its use.

History
Pectin was first isolated and described in 1825 by Henri Braconnot, though the action of pectin to make jams and marmalades was known long before. To obtain well-set jams from fruits that had little or only poor quality pectin, pectin-rich fruits or their extracts were mixed into the recipe.

During the Industrial Revolution, the makers of fruit preserves turned to producers of apple juice to obtain dried apple pomace that was cooked to extract pectin.  Later, in the 1920s and 1930s, factories were built that commercially extracted pectin from dried apple pomace, and later citrus peel, in regions that produced apple juice in both the US and Europe.

Pectin was first sold as a liquid extract, but is now most often used as dried powder, which is easier than a liquid to store and handle.

See also

 Fruit snacks

References

External links
Codex General Standard for Food Additives (GSFA) Online Database; A list of permitted uses of pectin, further link to the JECFA (...) specification of pectin.
European parliament and council directive No 95/2/EC of 20 February 1995 on food additives other than colours and sweeteners; EU-Directive that lists the foods, pectin may be used in. Note: The link points to a "consleg"-version of the directive, that may not include the very latest changes. The Directive will be replaced by a new Regulation for food additives in the next few years.
Certo Health: Information on reported health benefits of apple pectin, (UK).

Polysaccharides
Food additives
Food science
Edible thickening agents
Demulcents
Food stabilizers
E-number additives